Basanti Sarma is an Indian politician. She was a Member of Parliament, representing Assam in the Rajya Sabha the upper house of India's Parliament as a member of the Indian National Congress.

References

Rajya Sabha members from Assam
Indian National Congress politicians from Assam
Women in Assam politics
1944 births
Living people